Astartea leptophylla, commonly known as river-bank astartea, is a plant endemic to Western Australia.

It blooms between December and March producing white flowers.

It is found along the south coast on river valleys, river banks, floodways, seasonally wet sites and estuaries in the South West and Great Southern regions of Western Australia where it grows in sandy-loamy soils over granite.

References

Eudicots of Western Australia
leptophylla
Endemic flora of Western Australia
Plants described in 1844